Javier Mora (born May 25, 1981) is a Mexican professional boxer in the Heavyweight division. He was defeated by Alexander Povetkin by a 5-round TKO, in Max Schmeling Halle, Prenzlauer Berg, Berlin, Germany.

Amateur career
Record 23-9

Professional career
Although he had won his next bout (changed to a No Contest on appeal to the California State Athletic Commission on August 7) against Canadian Kirk Johnson in March 2006 in his comeback trail. Mora appeared to have accidentally stepped on Johnson's foot, causing Johnson to dislocate his knee. This decision was subsequently appealed and the result later changed.

He fought Sultan Ibragimov on 2 weeks notice at Madison Square Garden on March 13, 2007 and referee had stopped at the 46 seconds of the  first round when Mora wasn't firing back.

On March 13, 2010 he fought Alexander Povetkin only to lose on a fifth round technical knockout over Mora. In the 5th round, he had Mora cornered, launched a massive combination and sent Mora sprawling to the floor for a third time, at which time the referee waved off the bout.

Professional record

|- style="margin:0.5em auto; font-size:95%;"
|align="center" colspan=8|22 Wins (18 knockouts), 6 Losses(2 knockouts), 1 Draw 1 NC
|- style="margin:0.5em auto; font-size:95%;"
|align=center style="border-style: none none solid solid; background: #e3e3e3"|Res.
|align=center style="border-style: none none solid solid; background: #e3e3e3"|Record
|align=center style="border-style: none none solid solid; background: #e3e3e3"|Opponent
|align=center style="border-style: none none solid solid; background: #e3e3e3"|Type
|align=center style="border-style: none none solid solid; background: #e3e3e3"|Rd., Time
|align=center style="border-style: none none solid solid; background: #e3e3e3"|Date
|align=center style="border-style: none none solid solid; background: #e3e3e3"|Location
|align=center style="border-style: none none solid solid; background: #e3e3e3"|Notes
|-align=center
|Loss ||22-6-1 ||align=left| Alexander Povetkin
|TKO || 5(0:50) || 2010-03-13|| align=left| Max Schmeling Halle, Prenzlauer Berg, Berlin, Germany
|align=left|
|-align=center
|Loss || 22-5-1 ||align=left| Johnathon Banks 
|MD || 8(8) || 2009-09-26 || align=left| Staples Center, Los Angeles, California,
|align=left|
|-align=center
|Win || 22-4-1 ||align=left| Jonathan Williams  
|KO || 1(1:19) || 2008-11-13 || align=left|Expo Center, El Monte, California
|align=left|
|-align=center
|Loss || 21-4-1 ||align=left| Sultan Ibragimov 
|TKO || 1(0:46) || 2007-03-10 || align=left| Madison Square Garden, New York, New York
|align=left|
|-align=center
|Win || 21-3-1 ||align=left| Earl Ladson 
|UD || 6(6) || 2007-01-06 || align=left| Seminole Hard Rock Hotel and Casino, Hollywood, Florida
|align=left|
|-align=center
|Win || 20-3-1 || align=left| Willie Herring 
|UD || 6(6) || 2006-09-14 || align=left| Tachi Palace Hotel & Casino, Lemoore, California
|align=left|
|-align=center
|Loss || 19-3-1 || align=left| Fres Oquendo
|UD || 10(10) || 2006-05-25|| align=left| Pechanga Resort and Casino, Temecula, California
|align=left|
|-align=center
|style="background: #DDDDDD"|NC || 19-2-1 || align=left| Kirk Johnson
|NC || 7(10) || 2006-03-03|| align=left| Pechanga Resort and Casino, Temecula, California
|align=left|
|-align=center
|Loss || 18-2-1 || align=left| Charles Davis
|UD || 8 || 2004-10-16|| align=left| Oakland Arena, Oakland, California
|align=left|
|-align=center

References

External links
 

Boxers from California
Heavyweight boxers
1981 births
Living people
Boxers from Jalisco
American male boxers